Roald Amundsen was a Norwegian explorer of polar regions.

Roald Amundsen may also refer to:

 Roald Amundsen (footballer), Norwegian football defender
 Roald Amundsen (railcar), former Pullman Company private car 
 Roald Amundsen (ship), German steel-ship built on the Elbe River in 1952